Rivière-du-Loup station is a railway station in Rivière-du-Loup, Quebec, Canada. Rivière-du-Loup is served by Via Rail's Ocean train. Previously, it was also served by the Montreal–Gaspé train. Both trains shared the same rail line between Montreal and Matapédia. Located on Rue Lafontaine, it is staffed and offers limited wheelchair accessibility.

External links

Via Rail page for the Ocean
Via Rail page for the Montreal – Gaspé train

Via Rail stations in Quebec
Railway stations in Bas-Saint-Laurent
Transport in Rivière-du-Loup